TVNZ 2 is the second New Zealand television channel owned and operated by the state-owned broadcaster Television New Zealand (TVNZ). It targets a younger audience than its sister channel, TVNZ 1. TVNZ 2's line up consists of dramas, comedies, and reality TV shows. A small number are produced in New Zealand which are either of a comedic, soap opera or reality nature, with rest of the line-up imported from mostly a Warner Bros. or HiT Entertainment or Disney catalogue or a FremantleMedia or Hasbro or Endemol soap opera/reality TV catalogue.

TVNZ 2 is New Zealand's second-oldest television channel, formed in 1975 following the break-up of the New Zealand Broadcasting Corporation into Radio New Zealand, Television One and Television Two. It began broadcasting on 30 June 1975, and for most of the 1970s was known as South Pacific Television. In 1980, it became a part of TVNZ when South Pacific Television and Television One merged, and reverted to the name TV2. The channel was renamed TVNZ 2 in October 2016.

The channel is broadcast on the government owned Kordia terrestrial network as well as on one of the two Kordia satellite transponders, which is included in channel packages on the Freeview and Sky platforms.  Sky also make the channel available on one of their own satellite transponders.

History

TV2 was formed following the dissolution of the New Zealand Broadcasting Corporation on 1 April 1975, with the corporation splitting into Radio New Zealand and two television channels: Television One and Television Two. Whereas Television One took over WNTV1 in Wellington and DNTV2 in Dunedin as well as the existing channel frequencies, Television Two took over AKTV2 in Auckland and CHTV3 in Christchurch, broadcasting on channel 4 in Auckland and channel 8 in Christchurch. 

TV2 began broadcasting in Auckland at 1pm on Monday 30 June 1975. Broadcasting began in Christchurch five hours later at 6pm, due to extra time being needed to fix an aerial fault at the city's Sugarloaf transmitter. The opening weekend saw the country's first telethon, raising over $485,000 for the St John Ambulance Service.

As there was only one national link at the time, and Television One had priority, TV2 used the link overnight to feed the next day's programmes between Auckland and Christchurch so they could be broadcast simultaneously. During its first year, TV2 introduced the Goodnight Kiwi cartoon for its closedown, although it was not until 1980 that it assumed its most recognised form. 

TV2 began broadcasting in the Waikato on 1 September 1975. TV2 began broadcasting in Wellington in November 1975 after the city's infamous winds hampered aerial installation at the Mount Kaukau transmitter.

The channel had branded itself as "TV2 South Pacific Television" since its launch. In 1976, it dropped the TV2 moniker and was renamed simply South Pacific Television. This also reduced confusion in Auckland and Dunedin where Television One broadcast on channel 2 (TV2 broadcast on channel 4 in both centres). Along with Television One and Radio New Zealand, South Pacific Television became part of the Broadcasting Corporation of New Zealand (BCNZ) in 1977.

In 1980, South Pacific Television and Television One merged to form Television New Zealand (the channel was renamed "Television Two" and, later, "TV2" in 1982), with the promise of 'complementary programming'.
In 1981, tenders were called for the supply of programmes for TV2's morning slot. The following year Northern Television began producing programmes as the first private enterprise TV broadcaster in the country. In 1983 Northern TV was forced to close due to high costs and low advertising revenue.

The National government debated selling off TV2 to a private enterprise in 1983, but this did not happen. By mid-1987, TV2 was rebranded as "Network Two". In 1988 the Labour government dissolved BCNZ, and deregulated the broadcasting market. With the launch of TV3 in 1989, Network Two (now rebranded "Channel 2") moved away from complementary programming and repositioned itself as an entertainment channel, leaving more serious programming to TV One.

In January 1992, Channel 2 introduced 24-hour television overnight which lasted three months. It went back to a nightly closedown but 24-hour programming was reintroduced by mid-1993, initially on Fridays and Saturdays. By mid-1994, 24-hour programming on Channel 2 was extended to Thursdays to Sundays, and on 19 October 1994, Channel 2 began broadcasting non-stop, 24 hours a day. In 1995, Channel 2 reverted to its old name, TV2.

TV2's highest-ever rating broadcast was the BBC Panorama interview with Diana, Princess of Wales, which screened on 21 November 1995. 1.517 million New Zealanders tuned in, or 41 percent of New Zealand's population (3.706 million). The broadcast remained the country's most watched television broadcast until 31 August 1997, when TV One's breaking news of Diana's death gained 1.703 million viewers.

On 22 September 2007, TV2 went into 16:9 widescreen on Freeview 24 hours a day.

On 2 September 2010, TV2 changed from broadcasting in 720p high definition to 1080i.

On New Year's Day 2012, TV2 introduced a new look graphics package with a new theme song for the network. At the same time, the TV2 digital on-screen graphic logo moved from the top right hand corner of the screen to the bottom right hand corner of the screen, for the first time since 2003.

From 19 August 2013, TV2 reacquired broadcast rights for Home and Away, after outbidding TV3.

On 1 October 2016, the channel was renamed TVNZ 2.

Programming 
Long-running TVNZ 2 programmes include children's show What Now (since 1981; on TVNZ 2 since 1989) and soap opera Shortland Street (since 1992).

TVNZ 2+1

TVNZ 2+1 was launched to Freeview and Sky customers on 1 September 2013 as TV2+1. It is a channel with a one-hour time shift of the Auckland TVNZ 2 feed. The channel is available on Channel 7 on Freeview and 502 on Sky. This channel replaced U, which was an interactive youth-orientated channel. When the channel was launched, TV One Plus 1 (now TVNZ 1+1) moved to Channel 6 on Freeview, while TV2+1 took over Channel 7. It was rebranded as TVNZ 2+1 on 1 October 2016.

Home Learning TV 
Home Learning TV was launched on 15 April 2020, and broadcast on the channel from 9am to 3pm on weekdays instead of a timeshift of TVNZ 2. From 12 June, it was shifted to TVNZ 2, broadcasting from 8:15am to 9am on weekdays. It was part of the government's efforts to encourage continued educational engagement during the nationwide lockdown that had closed all New Zealand schools. The content was hosted by various New Zealand educators.

References

External links

TVNZ
Television channels in New Zealand
Television channels and stations established in 1975
English-language television stations in New Zealand